Émilie-Sophie de Montullé, marquise Turpin de Crissé (8 May 1756 - 12 May 1816) was a French painter. She was the daughter of the magistrate Jean-Baptiste-François de Montullé (3 February 1721 - 26 August 1787) and the salon-holder Élisabeth Haudry (1727 - 13 March 1800). On 18 January 1775, she married Henri Roland Lancelot Turpin de Crissé (1754-before 1799).

References 

French women painters
18th-century French painters
19th-century French painters
19th-century French women artists
1756 births
1816 deaths